The 2003 Rally of Turkey (formally the 4th Rally of Turkey) was the third round of the 2003 World Rally Championship. The race was held over four days between 27 February and 2 March 2003, and was based in Kemer, Turkey. Citroen's Carlos Sainz won the race, his 25th win in the World Rally Championship.

Background

Entry list

Itinerary
All dates and times are EET (UTC+2).

Results

Overall

World Rally Cars

Classification

Special stages

Championship standings

Junior World Rally Championship

Classification

Special stages

Championship standings

References

External links 
 Official website of the World Rally Championship

Turkey
Rally of Turkey
Rally